Kyle Hinton (born February 27, 1998) is an American football guard for the Atlanta Falcons of the National Football League (NFL). He played college football at Washburn. He was drafted by the Vikings in the seventh round of the 2020 NFL Draft.

College career
As a senior at Washburn, Hinton received first-team All-American honors from d2football.com and was a second-team All-American according to the American Football Coaches Association and the Hansen Football Committee. He was a second all-region selection from the D2CCA and the Hansen Football Committee as well as a first-team all-MIAA selection. Hinton made his first catch of his career on an 8-yard touchdown pass in the Ichabods’ 57–41 win against Nebraska–Kearney during the season finale.

Professional career

Minnesota Vikings
Hinton was selected by the Minnesota Vikings with the 253rd pick in the seventh round of the 2020 NFL Draft. He was waived by the Vikings during final roster cuts on September 5, 2020, and signed to the practice squad the next day. On December 29, 2020, Hinton was promoted to the active roster.

On August 31, 2021, Hinton was waived by the Vikings and re-signed to the practice squad the next day. He signed a reserve/future contract with the Vikings on January 12, 2022.

Hinton was waived on August 30, 2022. He was re-signed to the practice squad one day later.

Atlanta Falcons
On January 18, 2023, Hinton signed a reserve/future contract with the Atlanta Falcons.

References

External links
 Minnesota Vikings bio
 Washburn Ichabods bio

1998 births
Living people
People from Peoria, Arizona
Sportspeople from the Phoenix metropolitan area
Players of American football from Arizona
American football offensive guards
Washburn Ichabods football players
Minnesota Vikings players
Atlanta Falcons players